Gastronaut may refer to:

 Gastronaut, a book, two BBC television series, and a YouTube channel by Stefan Gates
 Gastronaut Studios, developer of the video game Small Arms
 An alternate name for a gourmet, often used by Keith Floyd
 A food blog on the Houstonia magazine website